Johannes Zoet (12 October 1908 – 7 September 1992) was a Dutch fencer. He competed in the individual foil event at the 1948 Summer Olympics.

References

External links
 

1908 births
1992 deaths
Dutch male foil fencers
Olympic fencers of the Netherlands
Fencers at the 1948 Summer Olympics
Sportspeople from The Hague
20th-century Dutch people